The 1940 Florida Gators football team represented the University of Florida during the 1940 college football season. The season was the first of four for Tom Lieb as the head coach of the Florida Gators football team. Lieb was the former coach of the Loyola Lions, and had previously served as Knute Rockne's primary assistant and on-the-field replacement while Rockne was in the hospital during most of the Notre Dame Fighting Irish's 1930 national championship season. The highlights of the Gators' 1940 season included victories over the Maryland Terrapins (19–0), the Georgia Bulldogs (18–13), the Miami Hurricanes (46–6) and the Georgia Tech Yellow Jackets (16–7). Lieb's 1940 Florida Gators finished with a 5–5 overall record and a 2–3 record in the Southeastern Conference (SEC), placing eighth among thirteen SEC teams.

Schedule

References

Florida
Florida Gators football seasons
Florida Gators football